Ignatius Mrak (October 16, 1810 – January 2, 1901) was a Slovenian-born American prelate of the Catholic Church who served as Bishop of Sault Saint Marie and Marquette from 1869 to 1879.

Biography

Early life
Ignatius Mrak was born on October 16, 1810 in Hotovlja in the Duchy of Carniola in the Austrian Empire (present-day Slovenia). He was baptized Ignatz Mrack. He was one of six children of Mathias and Maria (née Demscher) Mrak. He received his early education at schools in Poljane and Kranj before attending the Bežigrad Gymnasium in Ljubljana. In 1834, he entered the diocesan seminary of Ljubljana, where he completed his theological studies with honors.

Priesthood
Mrak was ordained a priest on August 13, 1837 by Anton Aloys Wolf, the prince-bishop of the Diocese of Ljubljana. After passing a rigorous state examination, he was appointed a tutor to the son of Baron Peter Pirquet in Legnago, near Verona, where he remained for two years. He returned to Carniola in 1840 and served as an assistant pastor in Poljane and Slavina.

Influenced by the missionary work of his fellow Slovene, Frederic Baraga, Mrak sought admission to the Diocese of Detroit and arrived in the United States in October 1845. Bishop Peter Lefevere sent him to assist Rev. Francis Pierz, another Slovene, at the missions in the L'Arbre Croche region of Michigan. Mrak quickly learned the Ottawa dialect and, one month after arriving in America, preached an entire sermon in that language.

In 1847, Mrak was given his own mission at St. Anthony's in Cross Village, Michigan, while also attending other missions in Michigan:

 St. Francis Xavier's in Readmond
 St. Leopold's on Beaver Island in Lake Michigan
 Immaculate Conception in Peshawbestown

This territory was placed under the Vicariate Apostolic of Upper Michigan in 1853, headed by Bishop Baraga. The vicariate was elevated to the Diocese of Sault Sainte Marie in 1857, and Baraga appointed Mrak vicar general of the diocese in 1859.After returning from a European trip to recruit priests for the diocese, Mrak requested to return to Slovenia, but was persuaded to stay in Michigan by Bishops Baraga and Lefevere.

Bishop of Sault Saint Marie and Marquette 
On September 25, 1868, Mrak was named to succeed the late Bishop Baraga as bishop of Sault Saint Marie and Marquette by Pope Pius IX. However, he was reluctant to accept the position and refused to respond to the letters announcing his appointment for a few months. He finally yielded and received his episcopal consecration on February 7, 1869 from Archbishop John Purcell, with Bishops Lefevere and John Henni serving as co-consecrators, at St. Peter Cathedral in Cincinnati.

Mrak attended the First Vatican Council in Rome (1869-1870), which was announced a few months after his consecration. Over the course of his tenure as bishop, the diocese saw slow development. He increased the number of churches from 21 to 27 and the number of priests from 15 to 20. Two priests he ordained were: John Stariha, a fellow Slovene who would become the first bishop of the Diocese of Lead in South Dakota and Frederick Eis, a future Bishop of Marquette. At the same time, a depression in the Copper Country industry lead to a significant decline in the Catholic population. Two prominent schools, one in Sault Ste. Marie and the other in Hancock, closed during his first year as bishop. In 1874 he placed a church in Hancock under interdict after the congregation refused to accept their new pastor.

Retirement and legacy
After suffering an attack of rheumatism, Mrak submitted his resignation as bishop of Sault Saint Marie and Marquette to the pope.  It was accepted on April 28, 1879 by Pope Leo XIII, who gave him the titular see of Antinoë. His health turned for the better and he served at parishes in Negaunee and Menominee before resuming his missionary work, accepting a post in Peshawbestown. He returned to Marquette in 1891 and finished his days as a chaplain at St. Mary's Hospital.

Ignatius Mrak died at St. Mary's Hospital in Marquette, Michigan, on January 2, 1901, at age 90. He is buried in the crypt of St. Peter's Cathedral.

References

External links
 

1810 births
1901 deaths
People from the Municipality of Gorenja Vas-Poljane
Slovenian Roman Catholic missionaries
19th-century Slovenian Roman Catholic priests
Austrian Empire emigrants to the United States
Roman Catholic bishops of Marquette
19th-century Roman Catholic bishops in the United States
20th-century Roman Catholic bishops in the United States
Burials at St. Peter Cathedral (Marquette, Michigan)
Slovenian emigrants to the United States
Roman Catholic missionaries in the United States